OrangeTV was an Indonesian satellite television provider operated by PT Mega Media Indonesia, subsidiary of the MEI. Orange TV operated nationwide in Indonesia from 2012 to 2018.

Starting 2013 season, OrangeTV had the opportunity to be the official broadcast Premier League through a partnership with MP & Silva.

List of channels

Premium channels 
Until May 11, 2018
 Festival Channel
 Dangdut Channel
 Top Hits
 Celestial Movies
 Diva Universal
 KIX
 Thrill
 KBS World
 HBO
 HBO Family
 HBO Signature
 HBO Hits
 Fight Sports
 beIN Sports 1
 beIN Sports 2
 beIN Sports 3 Premier League

Free channels 
SCTV
ANTV
tvOne
MetroTV
TVRI
Indosiar
Trans TV
Trans7
Kompas TV
NET.
MNC TV
CNN Indonesia
GTV
RTV
MYTV
iNews
Gramedia TV
RCTI

References

External links 
 Official website

Direct broadcast satellite services
Television companies of Indonesia
2012 establishments in Indonesia
2018 disestablishments in Indonesia
Defunct companies of Indonesia
Products and services discontinued in 2018